Wuhua may refer to:

Wuhua County (五华县), Guangdong, China
Wuhua District (五华区), Kunming, China
Wuhua dialect, is a major dialect of the Hakka Chinese language

See also
 Wuhu (disambiguation)